The 2002 FINA Women's Water Polo World Cup was the thirteenth edition of the event, organised by the world's governing body in aquatics, the International Swimming Federation (FINA). The event took place in Perth, Western Australia from 10 to 15 December 2002. Participating teams were the eight best teams from the last World Championships in Fukuoka, Japan (2001). The top-five qualified for the 2003 World Aquatics Championships in Barcelona, Spain.

Teams

GROUP A

GROUP B

Preliminary round

GROUP A

10 December 2002

11 December 2002

12 December 2002

GROUP B

10 December 2002

11 December 2002

12 December 2002

Quarterfinals
13 December 2002

Semifinals
14 December 2002

Finals
13 December 2002 – Seventh place

14 December 2002 – Fifth place

15 December 2002 – Bronze Medal

15 December 2002 – Gold Medal

Final ranking

The top-five qualified for the 2003 World Water Polo Championship in Barcelona, Spain.

Individual awards
Most Valuable Player
???
Best Goalkeeper
???
Top Scorer
???

References

  Results
  Sports123

FINA Women's Water Polo World Cup
F
W
International water polo competitions hosted by Australia
Water Polo World Cup
December 2002 sports events in Australia
Women's water polo in Australia
Sport in Perth, Western Australia